Mandate for Leadership is a series of books published by The Heritage Foundation, an American conservative think-tank based in Washington, D.C. They are intended to serve as guidelines for reducing the size and scope of the federal government through specific policy recommendations. The books have traditionally been released to coincide with an incoming U.S. presidential administration, starting with the Reagan administration in 1981. The latest edition was published in November 2016. The 2020 (Biden) issue was still unpublished and assumed unfinished, but still available for pre-order, as of the closing months of 2021.

Early development
In 1979, at a Heritage Foundation trustees' meeting, it was suggested by Jack Eckerd, former head of the General Services Administration under Gerald Ford, that the Foundation draw up a conservative plan of action for the next presidential administration in January 1981. Robert Krieble proposed that Heritage produce a manual to help policymakers "cut the size of government and manage it more effectively".

The overall direction of the Heritage study was undertaken by Charles Heatherly, a former field director of the Intercollegiate Studies Institute. In late January 1980, Heatherly produced a five-page outline titled "Mandate for Leadership". Heatherly explained that the purpose of the project was to present concrete proposals to "revitalize our economy, strengthen our national security and halt the centralization of power in the federal government".

Both the Reagan–Bush and Carter–Mondale campaigns were approached by Heritage to discuss the project. However, they only received a reply from the Reagan–Bush campaign, and in July 1980, Reagan aide Edwin Meese was a surprise guest at a dinner held by Heritage for the project's team chairmen and co-chairmen. There, Meese gave the Heritage study his blessing, which was seen as a sign of the Reagan administration's receptiveness of the project.

Mandate I
In January 1981, Mandate for Leadership was released as a 20 volume, 3,000 page publication. Mandate contained more than 2,000 individual suggestions to move the federal government in a conservative direction, focusing on management and administration. The report "presented an explicit plan for reshaping public discourse on civil rights issues". To that end, it recommended the Justice Department "halt its affirmative action policies to remedy past discrimination against women and other minorities."

Specific suggestions related to spending included raising the defense budget by $20 billion in fiscal year 1981 and increasing it by an average of $35 billion over the next five years; establishing urban “enterprise zones” to encourage businesses to move into the nation's inner cities; reducing personal income tax rates by 10 percent across the board; calling for line-item veto power by the president; and developing a new strategic bomber by using B-1 and advanced bomber technology.

At the first meeting of his cabinet, President Reagan passed out copies of Mandate, and many of the study's authors were recruited into the White House administration. In particular, the Reagan administration hired key Mandate contributors Bill Bennett as chairman of the National Endowment for the Humanities (and later as Secretary of Education) and James G. Watt as Secretary of the Interior.

According to the authors of Mandate, around 60% of Mandate for Leaderships 2,000 proposals had been implemented or initiated at the end of Reagan's first year in office. In a report on the first year of the Reagan administration, the Heritage Foundation expressed particular disappointment with the government's defense and foreign policy, while it lauded the Office of Management and Budget.

Mandate for Leadership appeared on the Washington Post'''s paperback bestseller list and the Post called it “an action plan for turning the government toward the right as fast as possible.” The New York Times in 2002 called it “the manifesto of the Reagan revolution.”

Mandate II and III
In 1984, Heritage released Mandate for Leadership II: Continuing the Conservative Revolution. The study featured 1,300 recommendations from 150 contributors, and continued the original Mandate's aim of reforming the federal government and strengthening U.S. defenses. Heritage published its third manual for an incoming administration in 1988, titled Mandate for Leadership III: Policy Strategies for the 1990s. This edition was edited by Charles Heatherly and Burt Pines.

Mandate IV
Prior to the 1996 presidential election Heritage published the fourth Mandate for Leadership edition. Mandate IV was aimed at Congress, and focused on presenting a political strategy for Congress to continue the conservative policies of the outgoing Republican presidential administration. This edition of Mandate was offered as study material at an orientation conference attended by both Democratic and Republican freshman congressmen held by The Heritage Foundation and Empower America. In particular, a chapter on moving an agenda through Congress was recommended by Senate Majority Leader Trent Lott to House Speaker Newt Gingrich.

Mandate V
The fifth edition in the Mandate series, Mandate for Leadership 2000, included the edited transcripts of nine nonpartisan public sessions held by Heritage in 2000 called “The Keys to a Successful Presidency”. The forums focused on how past presidents and administrations implemented their policy agendas from their first day in office. Participants included Leon Panetta, former chief of staff to President Clinton; Martin Anderson, who advised President Reagan on domestic policy; Zbigniew Brzezinski, national security adviser to President Carter; and columnist Robert Novak. Historian and former congressional aide, Alvin S. Felzenberg  was Mandate for Leadership 2000s project director.

Mandate VI
In 2005, Heritage published the sixth edition of Mandate for Leadership. This edition of Mandate was just 156 pages long. According to Heritage, the shorter length reflected that policies and ideas from the early Mandate editions had, by the time of this publication, largely become part of the mainstream debate.

Mandate VII
The seventh edition of Mandate for Leadership'' was published in November 2016, shortly after the election of Donald Trump to the Presidency. This edition was longer, published in three volumes, in part because much of the progress toward the foundation's goals had been lost during the presidency of Barack Obama. This edition of the mandate was published in three volumes.

References

External links
The Heritage Foundation

The Heritage Foundation
Book series introduced in 1981